Pelotas is a Spanish tragicomedy television series created by José Corbacho and Juan Cruz. It was broadcast on La 1 of Televisión Española, between 23 February 2009 and 7 June 2010.

The series recounts the lives of local Unión Fútbol Club supporters in Hospitalet de Llobregat, a suburb of Barcelona.

Cast
Ángel de Andrés López
Javier Albalá
Belén Lopez
Celia Freijeiro
David Fernández Ortiz
Alberto Jo Lee

References

External links
Official site
 

2009 Spanish television series debuts
2010 Spanish television series endings
La 1 (Spanish TV channel) network series
2000s Spanish comedy television series
2010s Spanish comedy television series